The Argus As 5 was a large 24-cylinder 6 blocks' star aircraft engine, designed and built in Germany in the early 1920s by Argus Motoren.

Design and development
Following the Armistice of 1918, Germany continued to build aircraft and engines under the control of the Military Inter-Allied Commission of Control. For use on very large aircraft, Argus designed and built the As 5 WW-24 water-cooled piston engine.

The As 5 consisted of six banks of cylinders arranged around a common crankshaft with a single output shaft. Each cylinder drove the crankshaft through a master and slave big end, similar to most radial engines. The top and bottom sets of three cylinder banks were set at 45° to each other with a 90°  separation between the outermost banks.

Individual cylinders with sheet metal water jackets shared the aluminium alloy heads, four to a bank. Inlet and exhaust valves were actuated by shaft driven overhead camshafts. The aluminium alloy crankcase was split top and bottom.

Although some testing was carried out, the As 5 never flew and was abandoned along with the very large aircraft projects it was intended to power.

Engines on display
A single example survives on display at the Polish Aviation Museum in Kraków, Poland.

Specifications

References

Further reading

External links

Polish Aviation Museum - Argus As 5
Enginehistory.org - Argus As 5

As 5
1920s aircraft piston engines